Omar Nelson Bradley (February 12, 1893April 8, 1981) was a senior officer of the United States Army during and after World War II, rising to the rank of General of the Army. Bradley was the first chairman of the Joint Chiefs of Staff and oversaw the U.S. military's policy-making in the Korean War.

Born in Randolph County, Missouri, Bradley worked as a boilermaker before entering the United States Military Academy at West Point. He graduated from the academy in 1915 alongside Dwight D. Eisenhower as part of "the class the stars fell on." During World War I, Bradley guarded copper mines in Montana. After the war, Bradley taught at West Point and served in other roles before taking a position at the War Department under General George Marshall. In 1941, Bradley became commander of the United States Army Infantry School.

After the U.S. entrance into World War II, Bradley oversaw the transformation of the 82nd Infantry Division into the first American airborne division. He received his first front-line command in Operation Torch, serving under General George S. Patton in North Africa. After Patton was reassigned, Bradley commanded II Corps in the Tunisia Campaign and the Allied invasion of Sicily. He commanded the First United States Army during the Invasion of Normandy. After the breakout from Normandy, he took command of the Twelfth United States Army Group, which ultimately comprised forty-three divisions and 1.3 million men, the largest body of American soldiers ever to serve under a single field commander.

After the war, Bradley headed the Veterans Administration. He was appointed as Chief of Staff of the United States Army in 1948 and Chairman of the Joint Chiefs of Staff in 1949. In 1950, Bradley was promoted to the rank of General of the Army, becoming the last of the nine individuals promoted to five-star rank in the United States Armed Forces. He was the senior military commander at the start of the Korean War, and supported President Harry S. Truman's wartime policy of containment. He was instrumental in persuading Truman to dismiss General Douglas MacArthur in 1951 after MacArthur resisted administration attempts to scale back the war's strategic objectives. Bradley left active duty in 1953 (although remaining on "active retirement" for the next 27 years). He continued to serve in public and business roles until his death in 1981 at age 88.

Early life and education

Omar Nelson Bradley, the son of schoolteacher John Smith Bradley (1868–1908) and his wife Mary Elizabeth (née Hubbard) (1875–1931), was born into poverty in rural Randolph County, Missouri, near Moberly. Bradley was named after Omar D. Gray, a local newspaper editor admired by his father, and a local physician, Dr. James Nelson. He was of British ancestry, his ancestors having emigrated from Great Britain to Kentucky in the mid-1700s. He attended at least eight country schools where his father taught. The elder Bradley never earned more than $40 a month in his lifetime, while he taught school and sharecropped, the latter with the aid of all the family. They never owned a wagon, horse, or a mule. When Omar was 15, his father died. The youth credited his father with passing on to him his love of books, baseball and shooting.

His mother moved with him to Moberly, where she remarried. Bradley graduated from Moberly High School in 1910. He was an outstanding student and athlete who was chosen captain of both the baseball and track teams.

Bradley was working as a 17-cents-an-hour boilermaker at the Wabash Railroad when he was encouraged by his Sunday school teacher at Central Christian Church in Moberly to take the entrance examination for the United States Military Academy (USMA) at West Point, New York. Bradley had been saving his money to enter the University of Missouri in Columbia, where he intended to study law. He finished second in the West Point placement exams, held at Jefferson Barracks Military Post in St. Louis, Missouri. The first-place winner was unable to accept the Congressional appointment, however, and the nomination was passed to Bradley in August 1911.

While Bradley was attending the academy, his devotion to sports prevented him from excelling academically; but he still ranked 44th in a class of 164. He was a baseball star and often played on semi-pro teams for no remuneration (to ensure his eligibility as an amateur to represent the academy). He was considered one of the most outstanding college players in the nation during his junior and senior seasons at West Point, noted as both a power hitter and an outfielder, with one of the best arms in his day. He rejected multiple offers to play professional baseball, choosing to pursue his Army career.

While stationed at West Point as an instructor, in 1923 Bradley became a Freemason. He became a member of the West Point Lodge #877, Highland Falls, New York and continued with them until his death.

Bradley married Mary Quayle, who had grown up across the street from him in Moberly. Her father, the town's popular police chief, had died when she was young. The pair attended Central Christian Church and Moberly High School together. On the cover of the 1910 Moberly High School yearbook, The Salutar, they were shown across from each other, although they did not date during those years. His picture bore the description "calculative" and hers "linguistic." She earned a college degree in education.

West Point and early military career
At West Point, Bradley played three years of varsity baseball including the 1914 team. Every player on that team who remained in the army ultimately became a general. Bradley graduated from West Point in 1915 as part of a class that produced many future generals, and which military historians have called "the class the stars fell on". Bradley's Cullum Number is 5356. There were ultimately 59 general officers in that graduating class, among whom Bradley and Dwight D. Eisenhower attained the rank of General of the Army. Eisenhower was elected in 1952 in a landslide victory as 34th President of the United States. Among the numerous others who became generals were Joseph T. McNarney, Henry Aurand, James Van Fleet, Stafford LeRoy Irwin, John W. Leonard, Joseph May Swing, Paul J. Mueller, Charles W. Ryder, Leland Hobbs, Vernon Prichard, John B. Wogan, Roscoe B. Woodruff, John French Conklin, Walter W. Hess, and Edwin A. Zundel.

Bradley was commissioned as a second lieutenant into the Infantry Branch of the United States Army and was first assigned to the 14th Infantry Regiment. He served on the Mexico–United States border in 1915, defending it from incursions due to the Mexican civil war. When the United States entered World War I in April 1917 (see the American entry into World War I), he was promoted to captain and sent to guard the Butte, Montana copper mines, considered of strategic importance. Bradley, who was assigned to command the second battalion of the 14th Infantry, joined the 19th Division in August 1918, which was scheduled for European deployment, but the influenza pandemic and the armistice with Germany on November 11, 1918, that fall intervened.

From September 1919 until September 1920, Bradley served as assistant professor of military science at South Dakota State College (now University) in Brookings, South Dakota.

During the difficult period between the wars, he taught and studied. From 1920 to 1924, Bradley taught mathematics at West Point. He was promoted to major in 1924 and took the advanced infantry course at Fort Benning, Georgia. After brief duty in Hawaii, Bradley was selected to study at the U.S. Army Command and General Staff School at Fort Leavenworth, Kansas in 1928–29. Upon graduating, he served as an instructor in tactics at the U.S. Army Infantry School. While Bradley was serving in this assignment, the school's assistant commandant, Lieutenant Colonel George C. Marshall, described Bradley as "quiet, unassuming, capable, with sound common sense. Absolute dependability. Give him a job and forget it."

From 1929, Bradley taught again at West Point, studying at the U.S. Army War College in 1934. Bradley was promoted to lieutenant colonel on June 26, 1936 and worked at the War Department; after 1938 he was directly reporting to U.S. Army Chief of Staff Marshall.

On February 20, 1941, Bradley was promoted to the (wartime) temporary rank of brigadier general (bypassing the rank of colonel.) (This rank was made permanent by the Army in September 1943). The temporary rank was conferred to allow him to command the U.S. Army Infantry School at Fort Benning, Georgia (he was among the first from his class to reach even a temporary rank of general officer; first was his West Point classmate Luis Esteves, who was promoted Brigadier general in October 1940).

Almost a year later, on February 15, 1942, over two months after the American entry into World War II, Bradley was made a temporary major general (a rank made permanent in September 1944) and soon took command of the 82nd Infantry Division (soon to be redesignated as the 82nd Airborne Division) before succeeding Major General James Garesche Ord as commander of the 28th Infantry Division in June.

Louisiana Maneuvers
The Louisiana Maneuvers were a series of U.S. Army exercises held around Northern and Western-Central Louisiana, including Fort Polk, Camp Claiborne and Camp Livingston, in 1940 and 1941. The exercises, which involved some 400,000 troops, were designed to evaluate U.S. training, logistics, doctrine, and commanders. Overall, headquarters were in the Bentley Hotel in Alexandria.

Many Army officers present at the maneuvers later rose to very senior roles in World War II, including Bradley, Mark Clark, Dwight Eisenhower, Walter Krueger, Lesley J. McNair and George Patton.

Lieutenant Colonel Bradley was assigned to General Headquarters during the Louisiana Maneuvers but as a courier and observer in the field, he gained invaluable experience for the future. Colonel Bradley assisted in the planning of the maneuvers, and kept the General Staff in Washington, D.C. abreast of the training that was occurring during the Louisiana Maneuvers.

Bradley later said that Louisianans welcomed the soldiers with open arms. Some soldiers even slept in some of the residents' houses. Bradley said it was so crowded in those houses sometimes when the soldiers were sleeping, there would hardly be any walking room. Bradley also said a few of the troops were disrespectful towards the residents' land and crops, and would tear down crops for extra food. However, for the most part, residents and soldiers established good relations.

World War II
Bradley's personal experiences in the war are documented in his award-winning book A Soldier's Story, published by Henry Holt & Co. in 1951. It was re-released by The Modern Library in 1999. The book is based on an extensive diary maintained by his aide de camp, Chester B. Hansen, who ghost wrote the book using that diary. Hansen's diary is maintained by the U. S. Army Heritage and Education Center, Carlisle Barracks, PA.

On March 25, 1942, Bradley, recently promoted to major general, assumed command of the newly activated 82nd Infantry Division. Bradley oversaw the division's transformation into the first American airborne division and took parachute training. In August the division was re-designated as the 82nd Airborne Division and Bradley relinquished command to Major General Matthew Ridgway, who had been his assistant division commander (ADC).

Bradley then took command of the 28th Infantry Division, which was a National Guard division with soldiers mostly from the state of Pennsylvania.

North Africa and Sicily
Bradley did not receive a front-line command until early 1943, after Operation Torch, the Allied invasion of French North Africa. He had been given VIII Corps after being succeeded by Lloyd D. Brown as commander of the 28th Division, but instead was sent to North Africa to be Eisenhower's front-line troubleshooter. At Bradley's suggestion, II Corps, which had just suffered a great defeat at the Kasserine Pass, was overhauled from top to bottom, and Eisenhower, now the Supreme Allied Commander of the Allied forces in North Africa, installed Major General George S. Patton as corps commander in March 1943. Patton requested Bradley as his deputy, but Bradley retained the right to represent Eisenhower as well.

Bradley succeeded Patton as commander of II Corps in April and directed it in the final Tunisian battles of April and May, with Bizerte falling to elements of II Corps on May 7, 1943. The campaign as a whole ended six days later, and with it came the surrender of over 200,000 Axis Germans and Italians.

As a result of his excellent performance in the campaign, Bradley was promoted to Brevet lieutenant general on June 2, 1943 and continued to command II Corps in the Allied invasion of Sicily (codenamed Operation Husky). The campaign lasted only a few weeks and, as he had in Tunisia, Bradley continued to impress his superiors, Eisenhower most notably, who wrote to Marshall about Bradley:

Normandy 1944

In October 1943 Bradley moved to London as commander in chief of the American ground forces preparing to invade France in the spring of 1944. For D-Day, Bradley was chosen to command the US First Army, which, alongside the British Second Army, commanded by Lieutenant-General Miles Dempsey, made up the 21st Army Group, commanded by General Sir Bernard Montgomery.

On June 10, 1944, four days after the initial Normandy landings, Bradley and his staff debarked to establish a headquarters ashore. During Operation Overlord, he commanded three corps directed at the two American invasion targets, Utah Beach and Omaha Beach. During July he inspected the modifications made by Curtis G. Culin to Sherman tanks, that led to the Rhino tank. Later in July, he planned Operation Cobra, the beginning of the breakout from the Normandy beachhead. Operation Cobra called for the use of strategic bombers using huge bomb loads to attack German defensive lines. After several postponements due to weather, the operation began on July 25, 1944, with a short, very intensive bombardment with lighter explosives, designed so as not to create more rubble and craters that would slow Allied progress. Bradley was horrified when 77 planes bombed short and dropped bombs on their own troops, including Lieutenant General Lesley J. McNair:

However, the bombing was successful in knocking out the enemy communication system, rendering German troops confused and ineffective, and opened the way for the ground offensive by attacking infantry. Bradley sent in three infantry divisions—the 9th, 4th and 30th—to move in close behind the bombing. The infantry succeeded in cracking the German defenses, opening the way for advances by armored forces commanded by Patton to sweep around the German lines.

As the build-up continued in Normandy, the Third Army was formed under Patton, Bradley's former commander, while Lieutenant General Courtney Hodges, whom Bradley had succeeded as Commandant of the Infantry School, succeeded Bradley in command of the First Army; together, they made up Bradley's new command, the 12th Army Group. By August, the 12th Army Group had swollen to over 900,000 men and ultimately consisted of four field armies. It was the largest group of American soldiers to ever serve under one field commander.

Falaise pocket

Hitler's refusal to allow his army to flee the rapidly advancing Allied pincer movement created an opportunity to trap an entire German Army Group in northern France. After the German attempt to split the US armies at Mortain (Operation Lüttich), Bradley's Army Group and XV Corps became the southern pincer in forming the Falaise pocket, trapping the German Seventh Army and Fifth Panzer Army in Normandy. The northern pincer was formed of Canadian forces, part of British General Sir Bernard Montgomery's 21st Army Group. On August 13, 1944, concerned that American troops would clash with Canadian forces advancing from the north-west, Bradley overrode Patton's orders for a further push north towards Falaise, while ordering Major General Wade H. Haislip's XV Corps to "concentrate for operations in another direction". Any American troops in the vicinity of Argentan were ordered to withdraw. This order halted the southern pincer movement of Haislip's XV Corps. Though Patton protested the order, he obeyed it, leaving an exit—a "trap with a gap"—for the remaining German forces. Around 20,000–50,000 German troops (leaving almost all of their heavy material) escaped through the gap, avoiding encirclement and almost certain destruction. They would be reorganized and rearmed in time to slow the Allied advance into the Netherlands and Germany. Most of the blame for this outcome has been placed on Bradley. Bradley had incorrectly assumed, based on Ultra decoding transcripts, that most of the Germans had already escaped encirclement, and he feared a German counterattack as well as possible friendly fire casualties. Though admitting that a mistake had been made, Bradley placed the blame on General Montgomery for moving the British and Commonwealth troops too slowly, though the latter were in direct contact with a large number of SS Panzer, paratroopers, and other elite German forces.

Germany
The American forces reached the "Siegfried Line" or "Westwall" in late September. The success of the advance had taken the Allied high command by surprise. They had expected the German Wehrmacht to make stands on the natural defensive lines provided by the French rivers, and had not prepared the logistics for the much deeper advance of the Allied armies, so fuel ran short.

Eisenhower faced a decision on strategy. Bradley favored an advance into the Saarland, or possibly a two-thrust assault on both the Saarland and the Ruhr Area. Montgomery argued for a narrow thrust across the Lower Rhine, preferably with all Allied ground forces under his personal command as they had been in the early months of the Normandy campaign, into the open country beyond and then to the northern flank into the Ruhr, thus avoiding the Siegfried Line. Although Montgomery was not permitted to launch an offensive on the scale he had wanted, George Marshall and Hap Arnold were eager to use the First Allied Airborne Army to cross the Rhine, so Eisenhower agreed to Operation Market Garden. Bradley opposed the operation, and bitterly protested to Eisenhower the priority of supplies given to Montgomery, but Eisenhower, mindful of British public opinion regarding damage from V-1 missile launches in the north, refused to make any changes.

Bradley's Army Group now covered a very wide front in hilly country, from the Netherlands to Lorraine. Despite having the largest concentration of Allied army forces, Bradley faced difficulties in prosecuting a successful broad-front offensive in difficult country with a skilled enemy. General Bradley and his First Army commander, General Courtney Hodges, eventually decided to attack through a corridor known as the Aachen Gap towards the German township of Schmidt. The only nearby military objectives were the Roer River flood control dams, but these were not mentioned in contemporary plans and documents. Bradley and Hodges' original objective may have been to outflank German forces and prevent them from reinforcing their units further north in the Battle of Aachen. After the war, Bradley would cite the Roer dams as the objective. Since the Germans held the dams, they could also unleash millions of gallons of water into the path of advance. The campaign's confused objectives, combined with poor intelligence, resulted in the costly series of battles known as the Battle of Hurtgen Forest, which cost some 33,000 American casualties. At the end of the fighting in the Hurtgen, German forces remained in control of the Roer dams in what has been described as "the most ineptly fought series of battles of the war in the west." Further south, Patton's Third Army, which had been advancing with great speed, was faced with last priority (behind the U.S. First and Ninth Armies) for supplies, gasoline and ammunition. As a result, the Third Army lost momentum as German resistance stiffened around the extensive defenses surrounding the city of Metz. While Bradley focused on these two campaigns, the Germans were in the process of assembling troops and materiel for a surprise winter offensive.

Battle of the Bulge
Bradley's command took the initial brunt of what would become the Battle of the Bulge. For logistical and command reasons, General Eisenhower decided to place Bradley's First and Ninth Armies under the temporary command of Field Marshal Montgomery's 21st Army Group on the northern flank of the Bulge. Bradley was incensed, and began shouting at Eisenhower: "By God, Ike, I cannot be responsible to the American people if you do this. I resign." Eisenhower turned red, took a breath and replied evenly, "Brad, I—not you—am responsible to the American people. Your resignation therefore means absolutely nothing." Bradley paused, made one more protest, then fell silent as Eisenhower concluded, "Well, Brad, those are my orders."

At least one historian has attributed Eisenhower's support for Bradley's subsequent promotion to (temporary) four-star general (March 1945, not made permanent until January 1949) to, in part, a desire to compensate him for the way in which he had been sidelined during the Battle of the Bulge. Others point out that both Secretary of War Stimson and General Eisenhower had desired to reward General Patton with a fourth star for his string of accomplishments in 1944, but that Eisenhower could not promote Patton over Bradley, Devers, and other senior commanders without upsetting the chain of command (as Bradley commanded these people in the theater). A more likely explanation is that as Bradley commanded an Army Group and was the immediate subordinate of Eisenhower, who was promoted to five star rank in December 1944, it was only appropriate that he should hold the next lower rank.

Victory

Bradley used the advantage gained in March 1945—after Eisenhower authorized a difficult but successful Allied offensive (on a broad front with British Operation Veritable to the north and American Operation Grenade to the south) in February 1945—to break the German defenses and cross the Rhine into the industrial heartland of the Ruhr. Aggressive pursuit of the disintegrating German troops by the 9th Armored Division resulted in the capture of a bridge across the Rhine River at Remagen. Bradley quickly exploited the crossing, forming the southern arm of an enormous pincer movement encircling the German forces in the Ruhr from the north and south. Over 300,000 prisoners were taken. American forces then met up with the Soviet forces near the Elbe River in mid-April. By V-E Day, the 12th Army Group was a force of four armies (First, Third, Ninth, and Fifteenth) that numbered over 1.3 million men.

Command style

Unlike some of the more colorful generals of World War II, Bradley was polite and courteous in his public appearances. A reticent man, Bradley was first favorably brought to public attention by war correspondent Ernie Pyle, who was urged by General Eisenhower to "go and discover Bradley". Pyle subsequently wrote several dispatches in which he referred to Bradley as the GI's general, a title that would stay with Bradley throughout his remaining career. Will Lang Jr. of Life magazine said "The thing I most admire about Omar Bradley is his gentleness. He was never known to issue an order to anybody of any rank without saying 'Please' first."

While the public at large never forgot the image created by newspaper correspondents, a different view of Bradley was offered by combat historian S. L. A. Marshall, who knew both Bradley and George Patton, and had interviewed officers and men under their commands. Marshall, who was also a critic of George S. Patton, noted that Bradley's "common man" image "was played up by Ernie Pyle...The GIs were not impressed with him. They scarcely knew him. He's not a flamboyant figure and he didn't get out much to troops. And the idea that he was idolized by the average soldier is just rot."

While Bradley retained his reputation as the GI's general, he was criticized by some of his contemporaries for other aspects of his leadership style, sometimes described as "managerial" in nature. British General Bernard Montgomery's assessment of Bradley was that he was "dull, conscientious, dependable, and loyal". He had a habit of peremptorily relieving senior commanders who he felt were too independent, or whose command style did not agree with his own, such as the colorful and aggressive General Terry Allen, commander of the U.S. 1st Infantry Division (who was relocated to a different command because Bradley felt that his continued command of the division was making it unmanageably elitist, a decision with which Eisenhower concurred). While Patton is often viewed today as the prototype of the intolerant, impulsive commander, Bradley actually sacked far more generals and senior commanders during World War II, whereas Patton relieved only one general from his command—Orlando Ward—for cause during the entire war (and only after giving General Ward two warnings). When required, Bradley could be a hard disciplinarian; he recommended the death sentence for several soldiers while he served as the commander of the First Army.

One controversy of Bradley's leadership involved the lack of use of specialized tanks (Hobart's Funnies) in the Normandy invasion. After the war Chester Wilmot quoted correspondence with the developer of the tanks, Major General Percy Hobart, to the effect that the failure to use such tanks was a major contributing factor to the losses at Omaha Beach, and that Bradley had deferred the decision whether to use the tanks to his staff who had not taken up the offer, other than in respect of the DD (swimming) tanks. However a later memo from the 21st Army Group is on record as relaying two separate requests from the First Army, one dealing with the DD tanks and "Porpoises" (towed waterproof trailers), the other with a variety of other Funnies. The second list gives not only items of specific interest with requested numbers, but items known to be available that were not of interest. The requested items were modified Shermans, and tank attachments compatible with Shermans. Noted as not of interest were Funnies that required Churchill or Valentine tanks, or for which alternatives were available from the US. Of the six requested types of Funnies, the Sherman flamethrower version of the Churchill Crocodile is known to have been difficult to produce, and the Centipede never seems to have been used in combat. Richard Anderson considers that the press of time prevented the production of the other four items in numbers beyond the Commonwealth's requirements. Given the heavier surf and the topography of Omaha Beach, it is unlikely that the funnies would have been as useful there as they were on the Commonwealth beaches. The British had agreed to provide British-crewed Funnies to operate with the American forces but were unable to train the crews and deliver the vehicles in time.

Post-war

Veterans Administration
President Truman appointed Bradley to head the Veterans Administration for two years after the war. He served from August 15, 1945, to November 30, 1947 and is credited with doing much to improve its health care system and with helping veterans receive their educational benefits under the G. I. Bill of Rights. Bradley's influence on the VA is credited with helping shape it into the agency it is today. He was a regular visitor to Capitol Hill and lobbied on behalf of veterans' benefits in testimony before various congressional veteran affairs committees. Due to his numerous contributions to the Veterans Administration, the Secretary of Veterans Affairs' primary conference room at the headquarters of the Department of Veterans Affairs is named in Bradley's honor.

Chairman of the Joint Chiefs of Staff

Bradley became the Army Chief of Staff in 1948. After assuming command, Bradley found a U.S. military establishment badly in need of reorganization, equipment, and training. As Bradley himself put it, "the Army of 1948 could not fight its way out of a paper bag."

On August 11, 1949, President Harry S. Truman appointed Bradley the first Chairman of the Joint Chiefs of Staff. After his initial 1948 plan to expand the Army and modernize its equipment was rejected by the Truman Administration, Bradley reacted to the increasingly severe postwar defense department budget cutbacks imposed by Secretary of Defense Louis A. Johnson by publicly supporting Johnson's decisions, going so far as to tell Congress that he would be doing a "disservice to the nation" if he asked for a larger military force. Bradley also suggested that official Navy protests of Secretary Johnson's canceling the supercarrier  were due to improper personal or political, even mutinous motives, calling Navy admirals "fancy dans who won't hit the line with all they have on every play unless they can call the signals", and who were in "open rebellion against the civilian control."

In his second memoir, Bradley would later state that not arguing more forcefully in 1948 and 1949 for a sufficient defense budget "was a mistake... perhaps the greatest mistake I made in my postwar years in Washington."

On September 22, 1950, he was promoted to the rank of General of the Army, the fifth—and last—person to achieve that rank. That same year, Bradley was made the first Chairman of the NATO Military Committee. He remained on the committee until August 1953, when he left active duty. During his service, Bradley visited the White House over 300 times and was frequently featured on the cover of Time magazine.

In 1950 Bradley was elected as an honorary member of the New York Society of the Cincinnati in recognition of his outstanding service to his country.

Korean War
As Chairman of the Joint Chiefs of Staff, Bradley was the senior military officer at the outset of the Korean War. When North Korea invaded South Korea in June 1950, Bradley was faced with re-organizing and deploying an American military force that was a shadow of its World War II counterpart. The impact of the Truman administration's defense budget cutbacks were now keenly felt, as poorly equipped American troops, lacking sufficient tanks, anti-tank weapons, or artillery were driven down the Korean peninsula to Pusan in a series of costly rearguard actions. In a postwar analysis of the unpreparedness of U.S. Army forces deployed to Korea during the summer and fall of 1950, Army Major General Floyd L. Parks stated that "Many who never lived to tell the tale had to fight the full range of ground warfare from offensive to delaying action, unit by unit, man by man...[T]hat we were able to snatch victory from the jaws of defeat...does not relieve us from the blame of having placed our own flesh and blood in such a predicament."

Bradley was the chief military policy maker during the Korean War, and supported Truman's original plan of 'rolling back' Communist aggression by conquering all of North Korea. When Chinese Communists entered North Korea in late 1950 and again drove back American forces, Bradley agreed that rollback had to be dropped in favor of a strategy of containment of North Korea. The containment strategy was subsequently adopted by the Truman administration for North Korea, and applied to communist expansion worldwide. Never an admirer of General Douglas MacArthur, Bradley was instrumental in convincing Truman to dismiss MacArthur as the overall commander in the Korean theatre after MacArthur resisted administration attempts to scale back strategic objectives in the Korean War.

In his testimony to the U.S. Congress, Bradley strongly rebuked MacArthur for his support of victory at all costs in the Korean War. Soon after Truman relieved MacArthur of command in April 1951, Bradley said in Congressional testimony, "Red China is not the powerful nation seeking to dominate the world. Frankly, in the opinion of the Joint Chiefs of Staff, this strategy would involve us in the wrong war, at the wrong place, at the wrong time, and with the wrong enemy."

Retirement

Bradley left active military service in August 1953, but remained on active duty by virtue of his rank of General of the Army. He chaired the Commission on Veterans' Pensions, commonly known as the "Bradley Commission", in 1955–1956. In January 1956, Bradley became one of the founding members of the President's Board of Consultants on Foreign Intelligence Activities, later the President's Intelligence Advisory Board.

In retirement, Bradley held a number of positions in commercial life, including Chairman of the Board of the Bulova Watch Company from 1958 to 1973. He frequently visited Moberly, Missouri, which he described as his hometown and his favorite city in the world. He was a member of the Moberly Rotary Club, regularly played near-handicap golf at the Moberly Country Club course, and had a "Bradley pew" at Central Christian Church.

His memoirs, A Soldier's Story (ghostwritten by aide-de-camp Chester B. Hansen who kept a daily diary for him during the war), was published in 1951. Bradley started work on his autobiography A General's Life: An Autobiography (1983) before his death; it was coauthored with Clay Blair, who completed it posthumously. In this work, Bradley criticized British Field Marshal Montgomery's 1945 claims to have won the Battle of the Bulge.

On December 1, 1965, Bradley's wife, Mary, died of leukemia. He met Esther Dora "Kitty" Buhler and married her on September 12, 1966; they were married until his death.

As a horse racing fan, Bradley spent much of his leisure time at racetracks in California. He was often invited to present the trophies to the winners. He was a lifetime sports fan, especially of college football. He was the 1948 Grand Marshal of the Tournament of Roses and attended several subsequent Rose Bowl games. (He was driven in his black limousine through Pasadena; it had a personalized California license plate "ONB" and a red plate with 5 gold stars. He frequently was given a police motorcycle escort to the Rose Bowl on New Year's Day.) He also was prominent at the Sun Bowl in El Paso, Texas, and the Independence Bowl in Shreveport, Louisiana in later years.

In 1967–1968 Bradley served as a member of President Lyndon Johnson's Wise Men, a high-level advisory group considering policy for the Vietnam War. Bradley was a hawk and recommended against withdrawal.

Following the death of Dwight D. Eisenhower in March 1969, Bradley was the only surviving 5-star officer in the US Armed Forces.

In 1970, Bradley served as a consultant for the film Patton. Screenwriters Francis Ford Coppola and Edmund H. North wrote most of the film based on Bradley's memoir, A Soldier's Story, and the biography, Patton: Ordeal and Triumph, by Ladislas Farago. The screenwriters did not have access to General Patton's diaries nor did Patton's family grant interviews. They relied upon observations by Bradley and other military contemporaries when attempting to reconstruct Patton's thoughts and motives.

In a review of the film Patton, S.L.A. Marshall, who knew both Patton and Bradley, stated that "The Bradley name gets heavy billing on a picture of [a] comrade that, while not caricature, is the likeness of a victorious, glory-seeking buffoon...Patton in the flesh was an enigma. He so stays in the film...Napoleon once said that the art of the general is not strategy but knowing how to mold human nature...Maybe that is all producer Frank McCarthy and Gen. Bradley, his chief advisor, are trying to say." Though each recognized that he owed part of his success to the other, it was known that Bradley disliked Patton both personally and professionally, but in the film they are portrayed as friendly.

In 1971 Bradley was the subject of an episode of the TV show This Is Your Life.

Bradley attended the 30th anniversary of D-Day at Normandy, France on June 6, 1974, participating in various parades.

On January 10, 1977, Bradley was presented with the Presidential Medal of Freedom by President Gerald Ford.

In 1978, Bradley received the Golden Plate Award of the American Academy of Achievement presented by Awards Council member General Jimmy Doolittle.

Bradley was the keynote speaker at Pointe du Hoc, Normandy, France on June 6, 1979, for the 35th anniversary of D-Day. While seated in a wheelchair, he performed an open ranks inspection of the U.S. representative army unit, the 84th Army Band from VII Corps HQ, Stuttgart, West Germany.

Bradley lived during his last years in Texas at a special residence on the grounds of the William Beaumont Army Medical Center, part of the complex which supports Fort Bliss.

One of Bradley's last public appearances was as the guest of honor at the inauguration of President Ronald Reagan on January 20, 1981.

Omar Bradley died on April 8, 1981, in New York City of a cardiac arrhythmia, a few minutes after receiving an award from the National Institute of Social Sciences. He is buried at Arlington National Cemetery, next to his two wives.

General Bradley served on active duty continuously from August 1, 1911, until his death on April 8, 1981 – a total of 69 years, 8 months and 7 days. His was the longest active duty career in the history of the United States Armed Forces.

Recognition and legacy
Bradley's posthumous autobiography, A General's Life, was published in 1983. Bradley began the book but found writing difficult, and hired writer Clay Blair to help shape the work. After Bradley's death, Blair continued the writing. He used Bradley's first-person voice. The resulting book is also based on Blair's interviews of people in Bradley's circles, and on Bradley's personal papers.

Bradley is known for saying, "Ours is a world of nuclear giants and ethical infants. We know more about war than about peace, more about killing than we know about living."

The U.S. Army's M2 Bradley infantry fighting vehicle and M3 Bradley cavalry fighting vehicle are named after General Bradley.

Bradley's hometown, Moberly, Missouri, classifies him as a "favorite son" and is planning a library and museum in his honor. Bradley Leadership Symposia have been held in Moberly, honoring him as a teacher of young officers. On February 12, 2010, the U.S. House of Representatives, the Missouri Senate, the Missouri House, the County of Randolph and the City of Moberly recognized Bradley's birthday as General Omar Nelson Bradley Day.

On May 5, 2000, the United States Postal Service issued a series of Distinguished Soldiers stamps in which Bradley was honored.

There is also a elementary school named after him on Fort Leavenworth, Kansas.

Summary of service

Assignment history

 August 1, 1911: Cadet, United States Military Academy, West Point
 June 12, 1915: 14th Infantry Regiment
 September 10, 1919: ROTC professor, South Dakota State College
 September 13, 1920: Instructor, United States Military Academy
 September 15, 1924: Infantry School Student, Fort Benning, Georgia
 October 1, 1925: Battalion Commander, 27th Infantry Regiment
 June 10, 1927: Office of National Guard and Reserve Affairs, Hawaiian Department
 August 31, 1928: Student, Command and General Staff School
 August 1, 1929: Instructor, United States Army Infantry School, Fort Benning, Georgia
 August 18, 1933: Student, United States Army War College
 June 30, 1934: Plans and Training Officer, United States Military Academy
 June 1, 1938: War Department General Staff, G-1 Chief of Operations Branch and Assistant Secretary of the General Staff
 March 5, 1941: Commandant, U.S. Army Infantry School, Fort Benning, Georgia
 February 19, 1942: Commanding General, 82nd Infantry Division
 June 25, 1942: Commanding General, 28th Infantry Division
 April 16, 1943: Commanding General, II Corps, North Africa and Sicily
 September 9, 1943: Commanding General, Field Forces European Theater
 March 6, 1944: Commanding General, First Army
 August 1, 1944: Commanding General, 12th Army Group
 August 15, 1945: Administrator of Veterans Affairs, Veterans Administration
 February 7, 1948: United States Army Chief of Staff
 August 15, 1949: Chairman of the Joint Chiefs of Staff
 August 19, 1953: Remained on active duty without an assignment

Orders, decorations and medals

United States

  Combat Infantryman Badge (honorary)
  Army Staff Identification Badge
  Four Overseas Service Bars

Foreign orders
  Grand Cross, Legion of Honour (France)
  Grand Cross, Order of the Crown (Belgium)
  Grand Cross, Order of the Oak Crown (Luxembourg)
  Grand Cross, Order of George I (Greece)
  Grand Cross, Order of the Phoenix (Greece)
  Grand Cross, Military Order of Savoy (Italy)
  Honorary Knight Commander of the Order of the Bath (United Kingdom)
  Grand Officer, Order of the Liberator (Argentina)
  Grand Officer, Order of Military Merit (Brazil)
  Grand Officer, Order of Orange-Nassau (Netherlands)
  Commander, Order of the White Lion (Czechoslovakia)
  Commander of the Order of Ouissam Alaouite (Morocco)
  Commander's Cross of the Order of Polonia Restituta (Poland)
  Order of Suvorov (1st class) (Soviet Union)
  Order of Kutuzov (1st class) (Soviet Union)

Foreign decorations and medals
  French Croix de guerre with silver-gilt palm
  War Cross WWII (Belgium) with palm
  Czechoslovak War Cross 1939–1945
  Luxembourg War Cross
  Queen Elizabeth II Coronation Medal

Dates of rank
Source:

* – Discharged as Major and appointed Captain November 4, 1922; acts June 30, 1922 and September 14, 1922

** – Bradley's effective date for permanent brigadier general in the Regular Army is earlier than his effective date of promotion for permanent colonel. While serving as a temporary lieutenant general in early 1943, Bradley was notified that he would be promoted to permanent colonel with an effective date of October 1, 1943. At the time, promotions to permanent brigadier and major general had been withheld for more than two years, except for Delos C. Emmons, Henry H. Arnold, and Dwight Eisenhower. President Franklin D. Roosevelt lifted the moratorium after Bradley was notified that he would be promoted to colonel, but before the October 1 effective date.

In determining whom to promote after the lifting of Roosevelt's moratorium, Marshall consulted with Eisenhower, and they agreed to promote Bradley and several others. Marshall and Eisenhower then arranged the effective dates of promotion to brigadier general based on where they wanted each of the individuals selected to rank in terms of seniority. Bradley's date of rank for permanent brigadier general was then set as September 1, 1943—even though this was before his October 1, 1943 effective date for promotion to colonel—based on where Eisenhower and Marshall wanted Bradley to fall in terms of seniority as a brigadier general.

Bradley's and the other promotions to brigadier general on which Marshall and Eisenhower had conferred were not acted on until mid-October 1943 because Congress had to approve a waiver for those generals, including Bradley, who did not yet have 28 years of service. As a result, his October 1, 1943 date for promotion to permanent colonel was allowed to remain in effect. When Congress acted in mid-October to approve Bradley's time in service waiver and promotion to permanent brigadier general, his effective date for brigadier general was backdated to September 1, 1943. The September 1, 1943 date for permanent brigadier general enabled Bradley to line up with his peers where Marshall and Eisenhower intended for purposes of seniority.

The effective postdated (and then backdated) date of rank for Bradley's promotion to permanent brigadier general—September 1, 1943—thus came before the effective postdated date of rank for his promotion to colonel—October 1, 1943.

References

Further reading

 
 Blair, Clay (2003). The Forgotten War: America in Korea, 1950–1953. Naval Institute Press. .
 Blumenson, Martin (1990). General Bradley's Decision at Argentan (August 13, 1944). University of Michigan Library Press.
 Blumenson, Martin (1993). The Battle of the Generals: The Untold Story of the Falaise Pocket, The Campaign That Should Have Won World War II. William Morrow & Co. .
 Bradley, Omar N. and Blair, Clay (1983). A General's Life: An Autobiography. p. 752. New York: Simon & Schuster. .
 Bradley, Omar N. (1951). A Soldier's Story. New York: Holt Publishing Co. .
 Cowley, Robert; Parker, Geoffrey (1996). The Reader's Companion to Military History. Houghton Mifflin Company. .
 D'Este, Carlo (1995). Patton: A Genius for War. Harper Perennial. .
 Jordan, Jonathan W. (2011). Brothers Rivals Victors: Eisenhower, Patton, Bradley, and the Partnership that Drove the Allied Conquest in Europe. NAL. .
 Lavoie, Jeffrey D. Lavoie. The Private Life of General Omar N. Bradley. Jefferson McFarland, 2015. .
 MacLean, Colonel French L.  The Fifth Field: The Story of the 96 American Soldiers Sentenced to Death and Executed in Europe and North Africa in World War II, Atglen, PA: Schiffer Publishing, 2013, .
 Ossad, Steven L. Omar Nelson Bradley: America's GI General (U of Missouri Press, 2017)

 Weigley, Russell F. (1981). Eisenhower's Lieutenants: The Campaign of France and Germany 1944–1945. Bloomington, IN: Indiana University Press.  .
 Whiting, Charles (2000). The Battle of Hurtgen Forest. Cambridge, MA: Da Capo Press. .

External links

 Chester B. Hansen Collection – Hansen was the aide of GEN (and GOA) Bradley during and after World War II. US Army Heritage and Education Center, Carlisle, Pennsylvania
 Omar Nelson Bradley, Lt. General FUSAG 12TH AG – Omar Bradley's D-Day June 6, 1944 Maps restored, preserved and displayed at Historical Registry
 The American Presidency Project
 
 
United States Army Officers 1939–1945
Generals of World War II

|-

|-

|-

|-

|-

|-

|-

|-

|-

1893 births
1981 deaths
American five-star officers
United States Army personnel of World War I
Army Black Knights baseball players
Army Black Knights football players
Burials at Arlington National Cemetery
Chairmen of the Joint Chiefs of Staff
Commanders of the Order of Polonia Restituta
Honorary Knights Commander of the Order of the Bath
Military personnel from Missouri
NATO military personnel
People from Moberly, Missouri
Presidential Medal of Freedom recipients
Recipients of the Croix de Guerre 1939–1945 (France)
Recipients of the Defense Distinguished Service Medal
Recipients of the Distinguished Service Medal (US Army)
Recipients of the Legion of Merit
Recipients of the Navy Distinguished Service Medal
Recipients of the Order of Kutuzov, 1st class
Recipients of the Order of Suvorov, 1st class
Recipients of the Silver Star
United States Army Chiefs of Staff
United States Army Command and General Staff College alumni
United States Army War College alumni
United States Department of Veterans Affairs officials
United States Military Academy alumni
United States Army Infantry Branch personnel
Writers from Missouri
Graduates of the United States Military Academy Class of 1915
Recipients of the Czechoslovak War Cross
American people of British descent
United States Army generals of World War II
United States Army generals
South Dakota State University faculty
United States Military Academy faculty
United States Army personnel of the Korean War